Anthrobia monmouthia is a species of spider in the family Linyphiidae.

Distribution 
This species is native to North America and occurs in Alabama, Tennessee, Kentucky and Virginia.

References 

Spiders of North America
Cave spiders
Spiders described in 1844